Bajovci is a village in Herzegovina, in Čapljina municipality, Federation of Bosnia and Herzegovina, Bosnia and Herzegovina.

Demographics

Ethnic composition, 1991 census
total: 181

 Croats - 176 (97.23%)
 Muslims - 5 (2.76%)

According to the 2013 census, its population was 124, all Croats.

References

External links 
 Čapljina Portal umrli
 Official results from the book: Ethnic composition of Bosnia-Herzegovina population, by municipalities and settlements, 1991. census, Zavod za statistiku Bosne i Hercegovine - Bilten no.234, Sarajevo 1991.

Villages in the Federation of Bosnia and Herzegovina
Populated places in Čapljina
Croat communities in Bosnia and Herzegovina